The Railway Safety Agency, in Spanish, Agencia Estatal de Seguridad Ferroviaria (AESF) is a Spanish state agency within the Department of Transport. The AESF is the highest railway authority and responsible for the railway safety. It carries out safety management and supervision of all elements of the railway system: infrastructures, rolling stock, railway personnel, and railway operation. The agency is responsible for granting, suspending and revoking the licenses of railway companies.

Functions
As the responsible authority of the railway safety, the AESF is responsible for:
 Ensure security on state railroads.
 Monitor the functioning of the systems and check that they meet the requirements.
 Authorize the commissioning of railway vehicles.
 Issue, renew, modify, or revoke the safety certificates of railway companies and monitor them at a later date.
 Issue, renew, modify, or revoke the security authorizations of infrastructure managers, as well as supervise them later.
 Propose and develop the safety regulatory framework and monitor its compliance by railway system actors, as well as formulate proposals, guidelines and policy recommendations, including the technical specifications of the railway subsystems.
 Prepare reports on railway transport safety.
 Organize and manage the Special Railway Register.
 To grant, suspend, and revoke the homologation of the training centers and psychophysical reconnaissance centers of the railway personnel.
 To grant, suspend, and revoke the homologation of the maintenance centers, as well as the certification of the entities in charge of maintenance.
 Attend and participate in the working groups of the European Railway Agency and other national and international organizations related to the safety or interoperability of rail transport.
 To exercise the powers of the Ministry of Public Works in relation to the transport of dangerous goods by rail.
 To exercise the powers that correspond to the Ministry of Public Works in relation to the defense of the public railway domain and with the modification of the limit line of the building, without prejudice to the competences that correspond to the administrator of railway infrastructures.
 Exercise the sanctioning power in matters of railway safety.

Organization
The agency is structured into three main governing bodies as follows:
 Presidency with Direction, a subdirection of railway coordination and Subdirection of infrastructures and a Division of administration.
 Governing council.
 Control commission.

Presidency
The President is the institutional representative of the agency and its Governing Council. The President of the Agency is the head of the Secretary-General for Infrastructure. The President, since 23 March 2019 Julián López Milla.

Governing Council
The highest governing body of the agency is the Governing Council, which includes representatives of the Ministry of Development; the Ministry of Territorial Policy and Civil Service; Ministry of Finance; Ministry of Economy and Ministry of Industry, Trade and Tourism.

Director
The Director is the executive officer of the Agency and responsible for its ordinary management. The director is appointed by the Governing Council. The director of the agency is Pedro M. Lekuona García, since 2017.

The first directo of the agency was Carlos Díez Arroyo, who served from 2015 to 2017.

Budget
The 2023 budget was 16.5 million per the Secretary of State for Budgets and Expenditures (Secretaría de Estado de Presupuestos y Gastos).

See also
 European Railway Agency
 Rail transport in Spain
 Rail transport in Europe
 History of rail transport in Spain

References

Government agencies of Spain
Rail transport in Europe
Rail transport in Spain
Government agencies established in 2014
Transport in Spain
Rail transport organizations
Railway safety